Macauley Anthony Southam-Hales (born 2 February 1996) is a Welsh professional footballer who plays as a right back for  club Stockport County.

Career
After playing for Cardiff City and Barry Town United, Southam-Hales signed for Fleetwood Town in January 2019. In January 2020 he moved on loan to Hartlepool United. After returning to Fleetwood following the loan spell, Southam-Hales was a late substitute in the League One play-off tie against Wycombe Wanderers.

In September 2020, Southam-Hales signed for National League side Stockport County. In December 2022 he was injured during a FA Cup match; footage of the incident was used by the Football Association in a TikTok, for which they later apologised. He was given the all clear after going to hospital. The Professional Footballers Association called for changes to safety rules following the incident.

Career statistics

Honours
Stockport County
National League: 2021–22

References

1996 births
Living people
Footballers from Cardiff
Welsh footballers
Association football defenders
Cardiff City F.C. players
Barry Town United F.C. players
Fleetwood Town F.C. players
Stockport County F.C. players
Hartlepool United F.C. players
Cymru Premier players
English Football League players
National League (English football) players